The 2014 FIVB Beach Volleyball World Tour is an international beach volleyball circuit organized by the Fédération Internationale de Volleyball (FIVB).

From this season, the FIVB World Tour calendar comprises the 10 FIVB World Tour Grand Slams and 10 Open tournaments. The Phuket Open was originally scheduled for October but was cancelled due to political unrest in Thailand. La Réunion Open (men) and Chennai Open (both gender) were later cancelled also.

The FIVB Open tournaments returned as part of the World Tour.

Schedule
Key

Men

Women

Medal table by country

References

External links
2014 FIVB World Tour at FIVB.org

 

World Tour
2014